USS Fanning (FF-1076), a , is the third ship of the United States Navy to be named for Nathaniel Fanning.

Design and description
The Knox-class design was derived from the  modified to extend range and without a long-range missile system. They displaced  at full load. Their crew consisted of 13 officers and 211 enlisted men.

The ships were equipped with one Westinghouse geared steam turbine that drove the single propeller shaft.

The Knox-class ships were armed with a 5"/54 caliber Mark 42 gun forward and a single 3-inch/50-caliber gun aft. They mounted an eight-round ASROC launcher between the 5-inch (127 mm) gun and the bridge. Close-range anti-submarine defense was provided by two twin  Mk 32 torpedo tubes. The ships were equipped with a torpedo-carrying DASH drone helicopter; its telescoping hangar and landing pad were positioned amidships aft of the mack. Beginning in the 1970s, the DASH was replaced by a SH-2 Seasprite LAMPS I helicopter and the hangar and landing deck were accordingly enlarged. Most ships also had the 3-inch (76 mm) gun replaced by an eight-cell BPDMS missile launcher in the early 1970s. None of the class was actually built mounting a 3-inch gun.

Construction and career 
Constructed by Todd Shipyards, Los Angeles Division, San Pedro, California, laid down 7 December 1968, launched 24 January 1970 and delivered 16 July 1971. She was commissioned 23 July 1971, decommissioned 31 July 1993 and was struck 11 January 1995. She was transferred to Turkey on her decommissioning and renamed Adatepe (F-251). Decommissioned by Turkey in 2001.

Notes

References

External links 

 navsource.org: USS Fanning (FF-1076)
 
 Navysite.de

 

Knox-class frigates
Ships built in Los Angeles
1970 ships
Ships transferred from the United States Navy to the Turkish Navy